Sofiya Burkhanova (born 1 December 1989) is an Uzbekistani shot putter.

She came third at the 2008 Asian Junior Athletics Championships. She threw over seventeen metres for the first time in 2009, winning the Uzbek national title in the process. This performance gained her selection for the 2010 Asian Games, where she finished seventh in the final. The following year she placed fourth at the 2011 Asian Athletics Championships. She went unbeaten on the Asian Grand Prix in 2012, with three straight victories.

Burkhanova came close to the medals again at the 2013 Asian Athletics Championships, this time placing fifth in the shot put. She won her first continental title at the 2014 Asian Indoor Athletics Championships, where her throw of  sufficed for the victory.

References

External links

Living people
1989 births
Uzbekistani female shot putters
Athletes (track and field) at the 2010 Asian Games
Athletes (track and field) at the 2014 Asian Games
World record holders in Paralympic athletics
Athletes (track and field) at the 2016 Summer Paralympics
Athletes (track and field) at the 2020 Summer Paralympics
Medalists at the 2016 Summer Paralympics
Medalists at the 2020 Summer Paralympics
Paralympic gold medalists for Uzbekistan
Paralympic silver medalists for Uzbekistan
Paralympic athletes of Uzbekistan
Asian Games competitors for Uzbekistan
Paralympic medalists in athletics (track and field)
21st-century Uzbekistani women